Seliger is a lake in Ostashkovsky District of Tver Oblast and, in the extreme northern part, in Demyansky District of Novgorod Oblast of Russia, in the northwest of the Valdai Hills, a part of the Volga basin.

Lake Seliger is a large system of lakes linked by effluents, has many small islands and is surrounded by forests, including pine woods with many berries and mushrooms. It is one of the biggest natural lakes of Central Russia. The only outflow of the lake, the Selizharovka River, has its source at the southern end of the lake and drains into the Volga. The drainage basin of the lake includes the major part of Ostashkovsky District, south of Demyansky District, as well as minor areas in Firovsky District of Tver Oblast.

Seliger is situated within a picturesque landscape of forests and hills. The lake is a protected nature reserve and is sometimes known as the "European Baikal" due to the diversity of its unique flora and fauna, similar to Lake Baikal. Valdaysky National Park covers the northern part of the lake.

Every Year, Seliger camp forums bring together young people to study and discuss issues in political science, economics, art, literature and culture.

Ostashkov is the only town on the lake and is one of the most popular resorts in central Russia. Nilo-Stolobensky Monastery is located on Stolobny Island. The closed urban-type settlement of Solnechny which is a military base occupies Gorodomlya Island.

Travel and tourism 
Seliger lakes offers a number of accommodations for tourists. Many places are surrounded by untouched nature.

References

External links

Tourism in Seliger area
Travel and Tourism to Seliger Lake
Map of Lake Seliger

Lakes of Novgorod Oblast
Lakes of Tver Oblast
LSeliger